Albert George "Albie" Thomas OAM (8 February 1935 – 27 October 2013) was an Australian middle- and long-distance runner who set world records at two miles and three miles. He was born in Hurstville, New South Wales.

Career

Thomas set a new world record (13:10.6) for three miles at Santry, Ireland on 9 July 1958. He returned to Santry later that summer. On 6 August, he was the pacemaker in Herb Elliott's mile world record of 3:54.5; he had enough strength left to finish the race in 3:58.6, his first four-minute mile. The following day, he ran two miles in 8:32.0, also a world record.

Thomas competed in the Olympics in 1956, 1960 and 1964, running 5000 metres on all three occasions and also participating in the 1500 metres the latter two times. His best Olympic finish was a 5th place in 1956. He also competed in the British Empire and Commonwealth Games in 1958 and 1962; in the 1958 Games in Cardiff he won a bronze medal in the mile run and a silver in the 3 mile race.

Albie was awarded a Medal of the Order of Australia, Australian Sports Medal, Centenary Medal, and has been admitted to the New South Wales Government Hall of Champions. He was awarded a Merit Award and conferred with Life Membership of St. George District Athletics Club.

Thomas died, aged 78, on 27 October 2013.

References

External links 
 
 
 
 
 
 
 

1935 births
2013 deaths
Athletes (track and field) at the 1956 Summer Olympics
Athletes (track and field) at the 1960 Summer Olympics
Athletes (track and field) at the 1964 Summer Olympics
World record setters in athletics (track and field)
Olympic athletes of Australia
Australian male middle-distance runners
Australian male long-distance runners
Recipients of the Medal of the Order of Australia
Recipients of the Centenary Medal
Commonwealth Games medallists in athletics
Commonwealth Games silver medallists for Australia
Commonwealth Games bronze medallists for Australia
Athletes (track and field) at the 1958 British Empire and Commonwealth Games
Medallists at the 1958 British Empire and Commonwealth Games